East Ferris is a township in northeastern Ontario, Canada located between Trout Lake and Lake Nosbonsing in the District of Nipissing. West Ferris has long been annexed into the city of North Bay.

Communities

The main communities within East Ferris are Astorville and Corbeil. There are also smaller residential areas in the township, known as Derland Road and Lake Nosbonsing.

Astorville and Derland were formerly stops along the Canadian National Railway Alderdale Subdivision. Rail service declined in the mid-20th century and was eliminated altogether in 1996.

In July 2005, Astorville hosted the first Northern Ontario Ball Hockey Championship. In November 2005, Astorville was one of nine communities that voted on whether to accept private funding for a health centre.

Corbeil is located on the La Vase River, at a turn in Highway 94 south of its terminus at Highway 17. The township's municipal office and fire station is located in Corbeil on Highway 94 south of Voyer Road.

Economy

Many residents who live in East Ferris, commute back and forth to the City of North Bay for work and for shopping.

Culture

The township's public library is located in Astorville.

The township holds an annual winter carnival, as well as town picnics in the summer.

Astorville is home to the Nosbonsing Curling Club.

Notable people
Canadian cartoonist Lynn Johnston lived and worked in Corbeil until she moved to North Vancouver in 2015.

The Dionne quintuplets were born on a farm near Corbeil. Corbeil was also the home of Marie-Louise Meilleur, a supercentenarian who was 117 years old when she died in 1998. She was the oldest living person in the world for the eight months preceding her death, and remains both the oldest verified person in Canadian history and the fourth oldest verified person in the world. She lived at the Nipissing Manor Nursing Home, which was once the mansion that housed the Dionne sisters.

Demographics 

See also
List of townships in Ontario
List of francophone communities in Ontario

References

External links

Municipalities in Nipissing District
Single-tier municipalities in Ontario
Township municipalities in Ontario